The Nigerian National Assembly delegation from Lagos comprises three Senators representing Lagos-Central, Lagos-East, and Lagos-West, and twenty-four Representatives representing Agege, Ajeromi/Ifelodun, Alimosho, Amuwo, Apapa, Badagry, Epe, Eti-Osa, Ibeju-Lekki, Ifako-Ijaiye, Ikeja, Ikorodu Kosofe, Lagos Island I, Lagos Island II, Lagos Mainland, Mushin I, Mushin II, Ojo,  Oshodi-Isolo I, Oshodi-Isolo II, Somolu, Surulere I, Surulere II

Fourth Republic

9th Assembly (2019-till date)

8th Assembly (2015-2019)

7th Assembly (2011-2015)

6th Assembly (2007–2011)

5th Assembly (2003–2007)

4th Assembly (1999–2003)

References 
Lagos State delegation to the National Assembly of Nigeria
Official Website - National Assembly Senators (Lagos State)

Lagos State politicians
National Assembly (Nigeria) delegations by state